Sylta Fee Wegmann (born 7 March 1987) is a German actress. She appeared in more than thirty films since 2002.

References

External links
 
 Profile at agenturpauly

1987 births
Living people
Actresses from Berlin
German film actresses
German television actresses
21st-century German actresses